Weirton Madonna High School is a private, Roman Catholic high school in Weirton, West Virginia.  It is part of the Roman Catholic Diocese of Wheeling-Charleston.

Principals
 Sr. Marian James, CSJ, 1955-1957
 Sr. Rose Winefride, 1957–58
 Sr. Mary Louise, 1958-1960
 Srs. Mary Ligouri, Adelaide William, and Mary Joan, 1960-1966
 Fr. Edward Bell, 1966-1971
 John York, 1971-1978
 James Chetock, 1978-1979
 Richard Evans, 1979-1983
 Peter Basil, 1983-1987
 Theresa DeCaria, 1987-1990
 Robert Gill, 1990-1997
 Al Boniti, 1998
 Dr. Cathy Sistilli, 1998-2008
 John Mihalyo, 2008-2012
 Steven Grasser, 2012-2014
 Jamie Lesho, 2014-2022
 Philip Rujak, 2022-Present

Demographics
As of the 2017-18 school year, the total student enrollment was 171.  The ethnic makeup of the school was 97.1% White, .6% Asian and 2.3% Multiracial.

External links
  School website

References

Roman Catholic Diocese of Wheeling-Charleston
Catholic secondary schools in West Virginia
Schools in Hancock County, West Virginia
Educational institutions established in 1955
1955 establishments in West Virginia